Green Fingers was an early Australian television series, which aired for two seasons on Melbourne station HSV-7. Much of what is known about the series comes from old TV listings. As the title suggests, it was a gardening series. The first season aired from 22 March 1957 to 3 January 1958, host(s) unknown. The second season aired from 29 August 1958 to 24 July 1959. TV listings in The Age list the cast as being John Sunnyman and Danny Webb. During its first season, it was a 5-minute series aired before HSV-7's newscast, but the second season aired as a 15-minute series in daytime. Both seasons aired on Fridays.

The series was replaced with/became About Your Garden, which aired from 31 July 1959 to 11 March 1960, and was hosted by Martha Gardner.

References

External links

Seven Network original programming
1957 Australian television series debuts
1959 Australian television series endings
Australian non-fiction television series
Black-and-white Australian television shows
English-language television shows